is an action-adventure game developed for the Famicom and MSX home computer, and released by Capcom in 1987. It is a sequel to a 1984 arcade game developed by Capcom known as Pirate Ship Higemaru.  Neither the arcade game, nor this adventure adaptation were released outside Japan, although a prototype exists for a canceled North American NES release, where it was to be renamed Makai Island"/.

In Higemaru Makaijima, the hero from Pirate Ship Higemaru named Momotaru must now pilot his own sailing vessel around the ocean surrounding seven islands.  His goal is to find the greatest treasure.  To do this, he must collect the keys which open the dock gates to each of the islands by invading several pirate ships and defeating the captain on board in combat.  The gameplay on these pirate ships are taken directly from the arcade predecessor, with some small modifications.

Once Momotaru has collected a key from a pirate ship, he must then sail around the islands in search of the correct dock gate which the key corresponds to. Once there, the player embarks on an exploration of the island to find items, defeat a boss, and collect treasures before heading off in search of another island key. The island exploration sections are extremely reminiscent of dungeon exploration aspects of The Legend of Zelda, to which the game is often compared.

External links
 Article imported from http://strategywiki.org/w/index.php?title=Higemaru_Makaijima&oldid=579324 under license CC-BY-SA 3.0
 

1987 video games
Japan-exclusive video games
Nintendo Entertainment System games
MSX2 games
Mobile games
Capcom games
Video games about pirates
Video games developed in Japan
Video games scored by Harumi Fujita